Armadale railway station is a railway station serving Armadale, West Lothian, Scotland. It is served by trains on the North Clyde Line.

History
The first station opened with the line on 11 August 1862. It was opened by the Bathgate and Coatbridge Railway which was then absorbed by the North British Railway. Becoming part of the London and North Eastern Railway during the Grouping of 1923, it passed on to the Scottish Region of British Railways on nationalisation in 1948, and was then closed by the British Transport Commission with the withdrawal of passenger services on 9 January 1956.

Reopening
The station was reopened as part of the Airdrie–Bathgate rail link, a project created to enable Glasgow and Edinburgh to be linked via a fourth route by reopening the railway between Airdrie and Bathgate. The very severe winter weather of November and December 2010 delayed completion of construction work, and the station was initially served by a replacement bus service. The station was reopened on 4 March 2011.

The new station is sited on the northeast side of the road bridge on the B8084 (Station Road), whereas the original station was situated just to the southwest of the bridge - the new location being to allow for car park construction and to comply with station curvature requirements (the original station was on a curve).

Services
In the evenings and on Sundays the westbound terminus is  rather than Milngavie.

References

Notes

Sources 
 
 
 
 
 

Railway stations in West Lothian
Former North British Railway stations
Railway stations in Great Britain opened in 1862
Railway stations in Great Britain closed in 1956
Railway stations in Great Britain opened in 2011
Railway stations served by ScotRail
Reopened railway stations in Great Britain
1862 establishments in Scotland
Armadale, West Lothian